Xanthisma, common name sleepy-daisy, is a genus of flowering plants in the family Asteraceae.

The generic name comes from the Greek "xanthos," "yellow", and "-ismos," "condition." It was first described in 1836 from material collected in "The Mexican Province of Texas."

 Species
 Xanthisma blephariphyllum (A.Gray) D.R.Morgan & R.L.Hartm. - TX NM 
 Xanthisma coloradoense (A.Gray) D.R.Morgan & R.L.Hartm. - CO WY 
 Xanthisma gracile (Nutt.) D.R.Morgan & R.L.Hartm. - CA NV UT CO AZ NM TX NY ME, Chihuahua 
 Xanthisma grindelioides (Nutt.) D.R.Morgan & R.L.Hartm. - Alberta, Saskatchewan, MT ND SD NE WY CO UT AZ NV NM 
 Xanthisma gypsophilum (B.L.Turner) D.R.Morgan & R.L.Hartm. - Coahuila, Durango, TX NM 
 Xanthisma junceum (Greene) D.R.Morgan & R.L.Hartm. - Baja California, AZ CA 
 Xanthisma paradoxum (B.L. Turner & R.L. Hartm.) G.L. Nesom & B.L. Turner - CO AZ UT 
 Xanthisma spinulosum (Pursh) D.R.Morgan & R.L.Hartm. - Nuevo León, Coahuila, Alberta, Saskatchewan, Manitoba, CA AZ NM TX AR OK KS CO UT NV ID WY MT ND SD NE IA MN 
 Xanthisma texanum DC. - TX NM AZ OK 
 Xanthisma viscidum (Wooton & Standl.) D.R.Morgan & R.L.Hartm. - TX NM

References

Astereae
Asteraceae genera
Flora of the Western United States
Flora of Northeastern Mexico
Taxa named by Augustin Pyramus de Candolle